The 1986 season was the Minnesota Vikings' 26th season in the National Football League, and their first with former offensive coordinator Jerry Burns as head coach, following the departure of Bud Grant at the end of the previous season.

The Vikings finished with a 9–7 record and missed the playoffs for the fourth season in a row.

Offseason

1986 Draft

 San Diego traded a 1st round selection (14th overall) and 2nd round selection (44th overall) to the Vikings for their 1st round selection (8th overall) and 3rd round selection (66th overall).
 Minnesota traded one of their 2nd round selections (40th overall) and LB Robin Sendlein to Miami for WR Anthony Carter.
 Minnesota traded two 2nd round selections (44th and 53rd overall) to the Giants for OT Gary Zimmerman.
 The Raiders traded their 1985 6th round selection (164th overall) and 1986 2nd round selection (53rd overall) to Minnesota for LB Brad Van Pelt.

Staff

Roster

Preseason

Regular season

Schedule

Game summaries

Week 1: vs Detroit Lions

Week 8: vs Cleveland Browns

Standings

Statistics

Team leaders

League rankings

Awards and records
On August 2, Fran Tarkenton was inducted into the Pro Football Hall of Fame in Canton, Ohio. He was the first player inducted who was primarily a Minnesota Viking during his career.
Tommy Kramer was named NFL Comeback Player of the Year by Pro Football Weekly.

References

External links
 Vikings on Pro Football Reference
 Vikings on jt-sw.com

Minnesota Vikings seasons
Minnesota
Minnesota Twins